Cascara may refer to:

Rhamnus purshiana, a plant known for its laxative properties
Coffee cherry tea, a herbal tea
Cáscara (rhythm), a Cuban rhythm played on the side of the timbales
Cascara, a fictional Caribbean island in the film Water

See also
Kaskara